HMS Esk may refer to one of the following Royal Navy ships named Esk after a Celtic word meaning a river:

 , a 20-gun post ship launched in 1813. She was sold in 1829 and became the whaler Matilda, which between 1829 and 1845 made four voyages to the British southern whale fishery.
 , a wood screw corvette launched in 1854. She was broken up in 1870.
 , an iron screw gunboat launched in 1877. She was sold in 1903.
 , a tender transferred from the War Department in 1905. She was sold in 1920.
 , an E-class destroyer launched in 1934. She was sunk by a mine in 1940 north west of Texel.

References
 

Royal Navy ship names